The 1980 European Championship can refer to European Championships held in several sports:

 1980 European Rugby League Championship
 1980 European Football Championship